Holy Cross Convent School may refer to:

 Holy Cross Convent School, Windhoek, Namibia
 Holy Cross Convent High School, Thane, Maharashtra, India

See also
 Holy Cross School (disambiguation)